The 1921 Grand National was the 80th renewal of the Grand National horse race that took place at Aintree Racecourse near Liverpool, England, on 18 March 1921.

The race was won by Shaun Spadah, a 100/9 bet ridden by Fred Rees and trained by George Poole for owner Malcolm McAlpine. The winner was the only horse to complete the course without falling.

In second place was The Bore, who remounted after falling at the second-last fence, having raced alongside the winner since Turkey Buzzard fell at Becher's Brook on the second circuit. All White and Turkey Buzzard were also remounted to finish third and fourth respectively. No other horses completed the race. Thirty-five horses ran and all returned safely to the stables.

Finishing Order

Non-finishers

References

 1921
Grand National
Grand National
20th century in Lancashire